Bombers is a sports drama web series starring Ranvir Shorey, Aahana Kumra, Sapna Pabbi and Varun Mitra in lead roles. The series follows the trials and tribulations of the fictional Chandannagar-based football club Bombers FC - primarily set in West Bengal. The football-based web series was released by ZEE5 on 22 June 2019 as a part of its on-demand content streaming service. Bombers is directed by Vishal Furia and written by Vishal Kapoor.

The series is the digital debut of India national football team captain and the captain of Bengaluru FC, Sunil Chhetri

Cast 
 Ranvir Shorey
 Aahana Kumra as Sanjana
 Sapna Pabbi as Andy
 Varun Mitra as Badol
 Prince Narula as Bali
 Meiyang Chang as Tokai
 Gaurav Sharma as Atul
 Flora Saini
 Zakir Hussain (actor) as Samu Da
 Anup Soni as Manik
 Shivam Patil as Toto
 Madhurima Roy

Episodes

References

External links 
 
 Bombers at ZEE5

2019 web series debuts
ZEE5 original programming
Indian drama web series
Television series by Banijay